Daphne Marlatt, born Buckle, CM (born July 11, 1942 in Melbourne, Australia), is a Canadian poet and novelist who lives in Vancouver, British Columbia.

At a young age her family moved to Malaysia and at age nine they moved to British Columbia, where she later attended the University of British Columbia. There she developed her poetry style and her strong feminist views. In 1968, she received an MA in comparative literature from Indiana University.

Her poetry, while considered extremely dense and difficult, is also much acclaimed. In 2006, she was made a Member of the Order of Canada.

Life and work

Early life
Daphne Marlatt is an author, teacher, writer, editor, mother and feminist. Her works include two novels, several poetry pieces, and many edited literary journals and magazines. Daphne Marlatt was born to English parents, Arthur and Edrys Lupprian Buckle, in Melbourne, Australia on July 11, 1942.

At the age of three, Marlatt's family moved to Penang, Malaysia and then at the age of nine her family immigrated to Vancouver.  Marlatt received her B.A. from the University of British Columbia in 1964 and while there, in 1963, became an editor for TISH, a Canadian literary journal.

After traveling around the continent with her husband, Gordon Alan Marlatt, a clinical psychologist, she then settled down for a while in Bloomington, Indiana where she received her M.A. from the Indiana University in Comparative literature in 1968.  It is here where she started to write Frames of a Story (1968).  Robert Lecker, in the 1978 article "Perceiving It as It Stands" from Canadian Literature, says "Marlatt has every right to join Kay and Gerda in flight, for their predicament, and the development of their story, serve as a metaphor for the problems of growth encountered by a poet struggling to break away from the frames imposed by established word patterns and the falsities implied by a world view which categorizes experience, storytelling it in standardized form, as if the motion of living was always the same, always sane."

In 1969, Marlatt published leaf leaf/s, which is a collection of shorter poems.  In 1971, Marlatt published Rings, a collection of poems about pregnancy, birth, and early parenting.  She started teaching writing and literature at Capilano College and also edited for The Capilano Review.  In 1972 she published Vancouver Poems.  Marlatt published a well known piece of hers, Steveston, in 1974.  This piece is about a small fishing village that Marlatt explains the relation to its history as a camp for Japanese Canadians during World War II.

Later life
In 1975, Marlatt published Our Lives, a poetry piece about "organic implosions of relationships", according to BookRags.  Marlatt and her partner, the poet and artist Roy Kiyooka, separated in the late 1970s and it is around this time that she and her son moved back to Vancouver. In 1977, The Story, She Said was published and so was her book, Zocalo.  Zocalo is a collection of long poems about the travels had through the Yucatán.  Marlatt's, What Matters: Writing 1968-1970, includes some of her early writings, including "Rings" and "Vancouver Poems" and was published in 1980.

Also, in 1980 she had, Net Work: Selected Writing, published, which contains new "confidence and authority", according to Fred Wah, a professor at the University of Calgary.  He goes on to say that "the flow of town and history, of the Japanese people and the cannery, especially of the river and language, are more securely rooted in place and concentrated in the writing consciousness than in any other of her books."  And according to www.athabascau.ca, Net Work: Selected Writing is "a selection of poetry spanning from Frames of a Story (1968) to What Matters (1980) is an excellent cross-section of her early poetry."  It is through these pieces and earlier pieces that Marlatt's feminist theory begins to emerge.

In 1977, Marlatt co-founded periodies: a magazine of prose (1977–81) and in 1981 published here & there.  It was around this time that Marlatt became more involved in feminist concerns, and attended and organized several feminist conferences.  She also, in 1985, co-founded Tessera, which is a feminist journal.  Around this time, Marlatt is quoted to saying, "a time of transition for me as i tried to integrate my feminist reading with a largely male-mentored postmodernist poetic, at the same time coming out as a lesbian in my life as well as in my writing."

In 1983, Marlatt's How Hug a Stone was published, which follows that journey traveled by herself and her son, in 1981, to England.  In 1984, Touch to My Tongue was published.  Both pieces "express her intense apprehension of the continually changing world.", according to Douglas Barbour, an author of The Canadian Encyclopedia.

Marlatt created two books, Mauve, published in 1985 and character/jeu de letters, published in 1986, with Quebec feminist and writer Nicole Brossard. Double negative, a piece that was put together between Marlatt and Betsy Warland, her significant other, was published in 1988.

In 1988, the introduction of one of Marlatt's most distinguished pieces, Ana Historic, was published.  This novel, according to www.athabascau.ca, " describes the experiences of women both historic and contemporary."  Marlatt describes her novel, Ana Historic, in a 2003 interview with Sue Kossew, a professor at the University of New South Wales, as follows:
"I like rubbing the edges of document and memory/fiction against one another. I like the friction that is produced between the stark reporting of document, the pseudo-factual language of journalism, and the more emotional, even poetic, language of memory. That's why I used such a hodgepodge of sources in Ana Historic: a little nineteenth-century and very local journalism that sounds like a gossip column, a 1906 school textbook, various historical accounts, some contemporary feminist theory, and a school teacher's diary from 1873 that was completely fictitious."

According to Caroline Rosenthal, author of Narrative Deconstructions of Gender in Works by Audrey Thomas, Daphne Marlatt, and Louise Erdrich, "Marlatt, in Ana Historic, challenges the regulatory fiction of heterosexuality. She offers her protagonist a way out into a new order that breaks with the law of the father, creating a "monstrous" text that explores the possibilities of a lesbian identity."

In 1991, Marlatt's piece, Salvage, was published, which explores parts of Marlatt's life and puts it together with a feminist's point of view.  In 1993 Ghost Works was published, which contains prose poems, letters, diary entries, short-line poems, and travel books to make a narrative.

In 1994, Two Women in a Birth, was published.  This piece was written by both Marlatt and her significant other, Betsy Warland.  This piece is "This collection of [poetry] represents ten years of collaborative work by two of Canada's leading feminist writers" according to books.google.com.

In 1996, Marlatt's second novel, Taken was published.  This novel that is a tribute to women whose lives have been taken by war.  In 2001, This Tremor Love Is was published. This Tremor Love is a collection of love poems over a period of twenty-five years, from Marlatt's first writing to her most recent. Marlatt's recent published piece, a collection of poetry called Seven Glass Bowls, was published in 2003.

In addition to all of Marlatt's published works she can be heard on the CD Like Light Off Water, Otter Bay, 2008, reading passages from her classic poetry cycle, Steveston. With music by Canadian composers Robert Minden and Carla Hallett, the CD offers a delicate resonance of microtonal nuance and lyrical intimacy surrounding Marlatt¹s poetic voicing, rhythm and imagery. In 2006 Marlett and her work were the subject of an episode of the television series Heart of a Poet produced by Canadian filmmaker Maureen Judge.

Marlatt has also taught at several colleges and universities.  These include:  University of Alberta, University of British Columbia, Capilano College, University of Calgary, University of Manitoba, McMaster University,  Mount Royal College, University of Saskatchewan, Simon Fraser University, University of Victoria and University of Western Ontario.  She also received four awards in her career.  She received the MacMillan and Brissenden for creative writing; the Canada Council award; the Vancouver Mayor's Arts Award for Literary Arts; and the Order of Canada for her contributions to Canadian literature.  Marlatt also founded the West Coast Women and Words Society.

Marlatt is currently a student of the Gelug school of Tibetan Buddhism, and currently lives in Vancouver, B.C.

Bibliography
Frames of a Story - 1968
leaf leaf/s - 1969
Rings - 1971
Vancouver Poems - 1972
Steveston - 1974
Our Lives - 1975
Zocalo - 1977
The Story, She Said - 1977
Opening Doors: Vancouver's East End - 1979 (oral history project, co-edited with Carole Itter)
Net Work: Selected Writing - 1980
What Matters - 1980
here & there - 1981
How Hug a Stone - 1983
Touch to My Tongue - 1984
MAUVE - 1985 (with Nicole Brossard)
Feminist Literature in the Feminine - 1985 (edited with Ann Dybikowski, Victoria Freeman, Barbara Pulling and Betsy Warland)
Double Negative - 1988 (with Betsy Warland)
Ana Historic - 1988
Telling It: Women and Language Across Cultures - 1990 (with Betsy Warland, Lee Maracle and Sky Lee)
Salvage - 1991
Ghost Works - 1993
Two Women in a Birth - 1994 (with Betsy Warland)
Taken - 1996
Readings from the Labyrinth - 1998
Winter/Rice/Tea Strain - 2001
This Tremor Love Is - 2001
Seven Glass Bowls - 2003
The Given - 2008
The Gull - 2010 (Noh Play)
Opening Doors in Vancouver's East End: Strathcona - 2011 (edited with Carole Itter)
Liquidities: Vancouver Poems Then and Now - 2013
Rivering: The Poetry of Daphne Marlatt - 2014
 Intertidal, collection of poems - 2017

See also

Canadian literature
Canadian poetry
List of Canadian poets

References

External links
 Bibliography of Marlatt criticism
 Strategies of Difference and Opposition. Daphne Marlatt and Hélène Cixous' writing strategy of écriture féminine.
 Opening Out. Daphne Marlatt shares her thoughts about transcending gender in spiritual life.
 "'The Inner Geography of Home': The Ecofeminist Poetics of D. Marlatt's Taken." By Eva Darias-Beautell:
Records of Daphne Marlatt are held by Simon Fraser University's Special Collections and Rare Books
Recordings of Daphne Marlatt are available online in the Unarchiving the Margins Collection at Simon Fraser University's Special Collection and Rare Books
 Archives of Daphne Marlatt (Daphne Marlatt fonds, R11776) are held at Library and Archives Canada

1942 births
Living people
20th-century Canadian poets
21st-century Canadian poets
Canadian feminist writers
Canadian women poets
Members of the Order of Canada
Lesbian feminists
Lesbian poets
Canadian LGBT poets
Writers from Melbourne
Writers from Vancouver
20th-century Canadian women writers
21st-century Canadian women writers
Canadian women novelists
20th-century Canadian novelists
21st-century Canadian novelists
Canadian LGBT novelists
Australian LGBT poets
Australian LGBT novelists
Lesbian novelists
21st-century Canadian LGBT people